Royal Lavanderia is a dry cleaning company established in 1995 in Santo Domingo, Dominican Republic and responsible for 63.4% of the market share of the dry cleaning market in the Dominican Republic. They have eight locations throughout the Dominican Republic.  The company acquired Dry Clean USA, which was previously the largest dry cleaning chain in the country.

Dry cleaning
Service companies of the Dominican Republic